Ivan Lumanyika Jumba (born June 28, 1992) is a Ugandan professional basketball player who for City Oilers.

International career 
Lumanyika represents Uganda in international competition. He helped the team appear in its first-ever AfroBasket, leading them past the qualifying rounds. With teammate Henry Malinga, he led Uganda to an 85–74 win over Somalia on September 21, 2014. Against Kenya, he posted 15 points and 11 rebounds. On July 6, 2015, he was named to the 20-man preliminary squad for the AfroBasket 2015.

Personal 
Lumanyika is left-handed.

References 

Living people
1992 births
Ugandan men's basketball players
Centers (basketball)
Uganda Christian University alumni
City Oilers players
UCU Canons players
JKL Dolphins players